Alexánder Castro Trejos (born February 14, 1979) is a retired Costa Rican professional footballer.

Club career
Castro made his league debut for Alajuelense on 7 February 1999 against Municipal Goicoechea, also immediately scoring a goal in the match, and played for Herediano, whom he joined for a second spell in August 2010, Cartaginés and Ramonense in the Primera División de Costa Rica.

In December 2011, Castro began legal proceedings against Herediano, claiming the club owed him money after they did not honor his contract until 2013.

International career
Castro played for Costa Rica at the 1999 FIFA World Youth Championship in Nigeria.

Castro made 23 appearances for the Costa Rica national football team, including two qualifying matches for the 2006 FIFA World Cup. He made his debut in a UNCAF Nations Cup 2001 match against Belize on June 23, 2001. He made two appearances for Costa Rica at the Copa América 2004 and five appearances at the 2003 CONCACAF Gold Cup.

His final international was a February 2005 UNCAF Nations Cup match against El Salvador.

References

External links
 

1979 births
Living people
People from Puntarenas Province
Association football defenders
Costa Rican footballers
Costa Rica under-20 international footballers
Costa Rica international footballers
2001 UNCAF Nations Cup players
2003 CONCACAF Gold Cup players
2004 Copa América players
2005 UNCAF Nations Cup players
L.D. Alajuelense footballers
C.S. Cartaginés players
C.S. Herediano footballers
Liga FPD players
A.D. Ramonense players
Copa Centroamericana-winning players